Bonteheuwel is a former Coloured township in Cape Town in the Western Cape province of South Africa.

Famous people 
 Pearl Jansen.
Ashley Kriel

References

Cape Coloureds
Townships in South Africa
Suburbs of Cape Town